The following is a list of notable brothers of Phi Kappa Tau, a college fraternity in the United States.

National presidents 

 deceased

Chief executives 
 Ralph K. Bowers, Mount Union 1917–1929
 Richard J. Young, Miami 1929–1961
 Jack L. Anson, Colgate 1961–1970
 William D. Jenkins, Bowling Green 1970–1978
 John W. Meyerhoff, Colgate 1978–1987
 John M. Green, Nebraska Wesleyan 1987–1998
 Joel S. Rudy, Bethany 1998–2002
 C. Steven Hartman, Muskingum 2002–2013
 W. Tim Hudson, Truman State 2014--2022
 Samuel W. Medley, Transylvania 2022 (interim)

Notable members
(dates following college names are fraternity initiation dates)

Law, politics, and government

 Jeffrey L. Amestoy (Hobart College 1965), former chief justice, Vermont Supreme Court; former Attorney General of Vermont
 C. Clyde Atkins (University of Florida 1935), Judge, U.S. District Court for the Southern District of Florida, 1966–99
 Spencer Bachus (Auburn University 1967), U.S. House of Representatives, Alabama
 Guy K. Bard (Franklin and Marshall 1921), Judge, U.S. District Court for the Eastern District of Pennsylvania, 1937, 1939–1952
 David Baria (University of Southern Mississippi), Mississippi State Senator 2008–2011, Mississippi House of Representatives, 2011–present
 John Barrasso (Rensselaer Polytechnic Institute 1971), U.S. Senator, Wyoming
 Ray C. Bliss (University of Akron 1938), Chairman of the Republican National Committee, 1965–1969
 John Y. Brown, Sr. (Centre College 1917), U.S. House of Representatives, Kentucky, 1933–35
 Randy Christmas (University of Miami 1948), Mayor of Miami, Florida
 E. Virgil Conway (Colgate University 1948), chairman of the board of the MTA, New York City
 John F. Cosgrove (University of Florida 1968), attorney; member of the Florida House of Representatives; mayor of Cutler Bay, Florida
 C. Welborn Daniel (University of Florida 1947), member of the Florida House of Representatives, 1956–1964; member of the Florida Senate, 1963–1966, 1968–1971
 Mike Dovilla (Baldwin–Wallace College 1994), member of the Ohio House of Representatives, 2011–present
 Gerald A. Drew (University of California, Berkeley 1922), U.S. Ambassador to Haiti and Bolivia
 John T. Elfvin (Cornell University 1938), Judge, U.S. District Court for the Western District of New York
 Richard Ervin (University of Florida 1926), Chief Justice, Florida Supreme Court, 1964–1975
 Lawrence H. Framme III (Centre College 1968), former chair, Democratic Party of Virginia
 Ralph M. Freeman (University of Michigan 1923), Judge, U.S. District Court for the Eastern District of Michigan, 1954–1990
 John M. Gerrard (Nebraska Wesleyan University 1973), Judge, U.S. District Court for the District of Nebraska; former Nebraska Supreme Court Judge
 Fred Hall (University of Southern California 1935), Governor of Kansas, 1955–1957
 William Gardner Hewes (University of Southern Mississippi 1981), Mayor of Gulfport, Mississippi; Mississippi State Senate,  1982–2012; Mississippi Senate President pro tempore, 2008–2012
 Robert E. Holmes (Ohio University 1941), Justice, Ohio Supreme Court, 1978–1992
 David L. Huber (University of Louisville 1962), United States Attorney for the Western District of Kentucky
 Harry Huge (Nebraska Wesleyan University 1956), internationally known trial attorney
 David M. Ishee (University of Southern Mississippi 1982), Associate Justice, Supreme Court of Mississippi
 Trent Kelly (University of Mississippi 1987), U.S. House of Representatives, Mississippi 2015-
 James Lawrence King (University of Florida 1946), Judge, U.S. District Court for the Southern District of Florida
 Richard G. Kopf (University of Nebraska-Kearney 1966), Senior Judge, U.S. District Court for the District of Nebraska
 William C. Lantaff (University of Florida 1931), U.S. House of Representatives, Florida, 1951–55
 Mitch McConnell (University of Louisville 1961), U.S. Senator, Commonwealth of Kentucky
 William E. McVey (Ohio University 1915), U.S. House of Representatives, Illinois, 1951–58
 Ken Mehlman (Franklin and Marshall College 1985), Republican National Committee Chairman, 2005–07
 James B. Milliken (Centre College 1918), Judge, Kentucky Court of Appeals (now Kentucky Supreme Court), 1951–75; chief justice, 1956–57, 1963–64, 1971–73
 Robert Moak (University of Mississippi 1979), Member Mississippi House of Representatives
 James Moeller (Nebraska Wesleyan University 1952), Vice Chief Justice, Arizona Supreme Court, 1987–1998
 Hugh M. Morris (University of Delaware 1930), Judge, U.S. District Court for the District of Delaware, 1919–30
 James D. Oberweis (University of Illinois 1966), member, Illinois Senate; owner of Oberweis Dairy
 Theodore Olson (University of the Pacific 1961), former Solicitor General of the United States
 Robert J. Parrillo (University of Colorado 1960), personal injury attorney
 Verle A. Pope (University of Florida 1962), president of the Florida Senate, 1966–68
 John Redwine (University of Kansas 1969), former member, Iowa Senate
 Kenneth L. Ryskamp (University of Miami 1954), Judge, U.S. District Court for the Southern District of Florida
 Thomas C. Sawyer (University of Akron 1966), U.S. House of Representatives, Ohio, 1987–2003
 Lee Solomon (Muhlenberg College 1972), Justice of the New Jersey Supreme Court
 Albert Lee Stephens, Sr. (University of Southern California Hon.), Judge, U.S. Court of Appeals for the Ninth Circuit, 1937–1965
 Albert Lee Stephens, Jr. (University of Southern California 1933), Judge, U.S. District Court for the Central District of California, 1961–2001
 George V. Voinovich (Ohio University 1956), former US Senator, Ohio
 Joseph R. Wright (University of Kentucky 1959) Kentucky Senate 1976–92, owner of Wright Implement

Military

 Robert Arter (Ohio University 1947), retired major general, U.S. Army; commanding general, Sixth United States Army
 Donald V. Bennett (Michigan State University 1934), general, U.S. Army; 47th superintendent of the United States Military Academy, 1966–69
 Leonard F. Chapman, Jr. (University of Florida 1932), Commandant United States Marine Corps, 1968–1972
 Donald R. Delauter (University of Maryland, College Park 1952), retired brigadier general, U.S. Air Force
 George S. Howard (Ohio Wesleyan University 1928), former commander and music director of The United States Air Force Band
 Paul Robert Ignatius (University of Southern California 1938), Secretary of the Navy, 1967–1969; former president of The Washington Post
 James G. Jones (Miami University 1953), retired major general, U.S. Air Force
 Rodney P. Kelly (Southern Illinois University-Carbondale 1963), retired major general, U.S. Air Force
 Robert J. Meder (Miami University 1936), member of the Doolittle Raiders of World War II
 Carl E. Mundy, Jr. (Auburn University 1955), retired general, Commandant, United States Marine Corps, 1991–1995
 Jerry D. Page (University of Southern California 1936), major general, U.S. Air Force; commandant, Air War College
 Virgil A. Richard (Oklahoma State University 1957), retired brigadier general, U.S. Army
 Cornelius E. Ryan (University of California-Berkeley 1931), major general, United States Army
 Joseph K. Spiers (North Carolina State University 1956), retired major general, U.S. Air Force; commander of Oklahoma City Air Logistics Center, Tinker Air Force Base
 Colonel Walbrook D. Swank, (Ohio State University 1933), command personnel officer, USAF
 Walter H. Yates, Jr. (University of Southern Mississippi 1962), retired major general, U.S. Army; deputy commanding general, Fifth United States Army

Education

 Jack L. Anson (Colgate University 1947), former executive director of the North American Interfraternity Conference; editor of Baird's Manual of American College Fraternities
 William Brantley Aycock (North Carolina State University 1934), chancellor of University of North Carolina at Chapel Hill, 1957–1964
 Rev. George O. Bierkoe (Muhlenberg College 1920), co-founder and first president of Endicott College, 1939–1971
 Edgar Ewing Brandon (Miami University 1906), acting president, Miami University, 1909–10, 1926–7
 Paul William Brosman (University of Illinois 1919), dean of the Tulane Law School, 1937–51
 Charles F. Chapman (Cornell University 1930), founder of Charles F. Chapman School of Seamanship
 Ward Darley, MD (University of Colorado 1924), president, University of Colorado, 1953–1956
 Benjamin Hudson, Ph.D., (Penn State 1974) professor of history and medievalist, Penn State University
 Walter S. Gamertsfelder (Ohio University 1952), president, Ohio University, 1943–1945
 William N. Johnston (Westminster College 1969), president of Wesley College (Delaware)
 Grayson L. Kirk (Miami University 1921), president of Columbia University, 1953–1968
 Richard Kneedler (Franklin and Marshall 1962), president of Franklin and Marshall College, 1988–2002
 Paul Moyer Limbert (Franklin and Marshall 1921), Secretary General of the World Alliance of YMCAs; president of Springfield College
 J. Sterling Livingston (University of Southern California 1937), professor of Harvard Business School, 1941–71
 Charles F. Marsh (College of William and Mary 1933), president of Wofford College, 1958–1968
 Robert Lee Mills (University of Kentucky 1935), president of Georgetown College, 1959–1978
 William H. Shideler, Ph.D (Miami University 1906), founder and chair of the Department of Geology, Miami University, 1910–1957
 William Strunk Jr. (Cornell University; member of local fraternity that became Alpha Tau Chapter), author of Elements of Style
 Paul B. Thompson (Georgia Tech 1972), philosopher and Professor Emeritus, Michigan State University
 James J. Whalen (Franklin and Marshall 1947), president of Ithaca College, 1975–1997

Science, technology, and medicine

 William F. Ballhaus, Jr. (University of California, Berkeley 1964), president and CEO of The Aerospace Corporation
 Charles Bassett (Ohio State University 1951), NASA astronaut
 Kenneth N. Beers, M.D. (Muhlenberg College 1949), NASA flight surgeon; professor emeritus at Wright State Medical School
 Everett Smith Beneke (Miami University 1937), professor at Michigan State University; noted mycologist
 Leroy Chiao (University of California, Berkeley 1979), NASA astronaut
 Vincent T. DeVita, Jr., MD (College of William and Mary 1955), leading oncologist
 John R. Dunning (Nebraska Wesleyan University 1926), key player in the Manhattan Project to create the atom bomb
 Paul H. Emmett, Ph.D (Oregon State University 1925), chair of the Department of Chemical Engineering at Johns Hopkins University; member of the Manhattan Project
 John E. Fryer, M.D. (Transylvania University 1954), pioneering psychiatrist and gay rights advocate
 Paul C. Lauterbur (Case Western Reserve 1951), 2003 Nobel Laureate in medicine for work in developing the MRI
 Roger Morse, Ph.D. (Cornell University 1948), chair of the Cornell department of entomology; expert on beekeeping
 Lee Oras Overholts (Miami University 1910), mycologist and professor, Penn State University
 Clyde Roper, Ph.D. (Transylvania University 1956), zoologist at the Smithsonian Institution
 M. Frank Rudy (Case Western Reserve 1948), inventor of Nike "Air" sole
 Richard C. Starr (Indiana University 1955) phycologist; professor at Indiana University and University of Texas; National Academy of Science; Guggenheim Fellow

Arts and entertainment

 Ralph Arlyck (Colgate University 1959), independent filmmaker
 Frank P. Austin (University of Cincinnati 1957), celebrity interior designer, designed Playboy Mansion interiors
 Joseph M. Bachelor (Miami University 1911), poet (pen name Joseph Morris), professor
 Lennie Baker (Northeastern University 1966), co-founder and retired president of the group Sha Na Na
 Bob Balaban (Colgate University 1964), actor, director, author
 Richard Barsam (University of Southern California 1956), author and film historian
 John Beradino (University of Southern California 1936), actor, General Hospital (played Dr. Steve Hardy) (also see sports)
 Shelley Berman (University of Southern California Hon. 2005), actor and comedian
 Ned Brooks (Ohio State University 1922), moderator of NBC's Meet the Press, 1953–1965
 Marc Butan (Ohio State University 1992), film producer and founder of MadRiver Pictures 
 Joseph W. Clokey (Miami University 1910), composer
 Jerry Clower (Mississippi State University 1949), comedian and member of the Grand Ole Opry
 Robert Dalva (Colgate University 1961), Academy Award-nominated film editor
 Frank Dungan (Bowling Green State University 1964), Emmy Award-winning TV writer/producer
 John Dykstra (Cal State-Long Beach 1966), winner of Academy Awards for visual effects and special effects
 Rick Evans (Nebraska Wesleyan University 1961), writer of In the Year 2525 as part of the group Zager and Evans
 Lew Hunter (Nebraska Wesleyan University 1952), screenwriter; chair emeritus of UCLA screenwriting program
 Fred Knoth (University of Colorado 1927), special effects head at Universal Studios; 1954 Academy Award for Technical Achievement
 John McCallum (Washington State University 1946), writer
 Paul Newman (Ohio University 1943), actor, philanthropist, director, race car driver, founder of Newman's Own
 Patton Oswalt (College of William & Mary 1989), actor, comedian
 Basil Poledouris (University of Southern California 1964), composer and conductor
 Stephen Sommers (University of Southern California 1983), movie director. producer and screenwriter
 John Stirratt (University of Mississippi 1986), bassist with the band Wilco
 Bruce Sussman (Franklin and Marshall College 1971), songwriter and librettist
 Ernest Vajda (University of Southern California 1938), playwright, novelist and screenwriter 
 Kitt Wakeley (East Central Oklahoma 1987), Grammy Award-winning composer, songwriter, musician, and music producer
 Jackie Walker, (University of California Los Angeles 1957), singer and songwriter
 Chad Warrix, Eastern Kentucky University 2012 (honorary), musician and songwriter
 Guy Williams, (Mississippi State University 1989), 3-time Academy Award nominee for visual effects
 Matthew Yuricich (Miami University 1946), Academy Award winner for visual effects

Religion
 O. Frederick Nolde (Muhlenberg College 1918), dean of the Lutheran Theological Seminary at Philadelphia; first director of the World Council of Churches Commission of the Churches on International Affairs (CCIA); contributor to the Universal Declaration of Human Rights
 Charles Lynn Pyatt (Transylvania University 1921), dean of the College of the Bible
 Martin Scott Field (Bethany College 1975) Bishop, Episcopal Diocese of West Missouri
 David Moyer (Muhlenberg College 1970), former Anglican bishop

Business and philanthropy
 Ewing T. Boles (Centre College 1914), chairman of the Ohio Company
 E. Garrett Bewkes IV (Colgate University 2007), publisher, National Review
 Nickolas Davatzes (St. John's 1960), President Emeritus of A&E TV network
 Malcolm Forbes (Miami University, Hon. 1982), former publisher of Forbes magazine
 William F. Kerby (University of Michigan, 1927), former Chairman, of Dow Jones and Company; editor of The Wall Street Journal
 Mark Mandala (University of Southern California, 1956), former president ABC Television
 Lee Miglin (University of Illinois, 1950), Chicago real estate developer and philanthropist
 Floyd R. Newman (Cornell University), founder, Allied Oil Co.
 David A. Ricks (Purdue University), chairman, president and CEO, Eli Lilly & Co.
 William Schwendler (New York University 1932), Chairman of the Grumman Aircraft Corporation
 Ernest H. Volwiler (Miami University, 1912), former chairman of Abbott Laboratories; co-inventor of Pentothal

Sports

 Elliott Avent (North Carolina State University 1975), head baseball coach, NC State
 Johnny Baker (University of Southern California 1929), 1931 All-American football player at USC; athletic director at Sacramento State
 Babe Barna (West Virginia University 1934), professional baseball player, 1937–43
 Al Barry (University of Southern California 1953), pro football player with the Green Bay Packers, New York Giants, and Los Angeles Chargers
 Dick Bass (Miami University 1927), pitcher with the  Washington Senators
 John Beradino (University of Southern California 1936), baseball player with the St. Louis Browns, Cleveland Indians, Pittsburgh Pirates (also see entertainment)
 Rob Bironas (Eastern Kentucky University 2012 (honorary), kicker with the Tennessee Titans
 Paul O. Bixler (Mount Union 1925), head football coach at Ohio State University, Colgate University; assistant coach and director of player personnel for the Cleveland Browns
 William R. "Bob" Boyd (University of Southern California 1949), men's basketball coach at University of Southern California, 1967–79
 Roger Counsil (Southern Illinois University 1957), national champion gymnastics coach, Indiana State University
 Dave Davis (University of Southern California 1958), Olympic shot-putter 
 Paul Dekker (Michigan State University 1953), pro football player with the  Washington Redskins and Hamilton Tiger-Cats
 Otis Douglas (College of William and Mary 1929), player with the Philadelphia Eagles, 1946–49; college football coach at Akron and Arkansas; pro coach at Akron, Baltimore and Calgary Canada
 Johnny Edwards (Ohio State University 1957), baseball player with the  Cincinnati Reds, St. Louis Cardinals, Houston Astros; All-Star Team, 1963, 1964, 1965
 Byron Gentry (University of Southern California 1929), football player with the Pittsburgh Pirates (now Pittsburgh Steelers), 1937–1939
 Bob Goin (Bethany College 1956), athletic director at Florida State University and University of Cincinnati
 Marc Guley (Syracuse University 1936), head basketball coach at Syracuse University, 1951–62
 Hal Herring (Auburn University 1947), football player with the Buffalo Bills, 1949, and Cleveland Browns, 1950–52; assistant coach at Auburn University, Atlanta Falcons and San Diego Chargers
 Mike Hudock (University of Miami 1957), College All-Star center; professional player with the  New York Titans and New York Jets
 Dave Hyde (Miami University 1980), sports columnist for the South Florida Sun-Sentinel
 Darrall Imhoff (University of California, Berkeley 1958), former NBA player; Olympic gold medalist
 Martin Kottler (Centre College 1930), charter member of the 1933 Pittsburgh Steelers
 Walt Kowalczyk (Michigan State University ), professional football player
 Wendell Ladner (The University of Southern Mississippi 1970), pro basketball player, ABA (Memphis Pros) and NBA (New York Nets)
 Keith Lincoln (Washington State University 1959), football player with the San Diego Chargers
 Dale Livingston (Western Michigan University 1965), football player with the Cincinnati Bengals and Green Bay Packers
 Ted Leitner (Oklahoma State University 1967), Play-by-play broadcast announcer, San Diego Padres
 Bill Mallory (Miami 1954), retired head football coach at Indiana University
 Matthew Mann (University of Michigan 1926), swimming coach, University of Michigan and 1952 Summer Olympics men's team
 Ray B. McCandless (Nebraska Wesleyan University 1923), college football, baseball and basketball coach
 Bud Metheny (College of William and Mary 1935), baseball player with the New York Yankees, 1943–46; coach, Old Dominion University
 Jess Mortensen (University of Southern California 1928), captain of the 1930 national champion track team at USC; coach of seven national champion track teams at USC
 Pete Newell (University of California, Berkeley 1958), retired general manager of the Los Angeles Lakers
 Bob Osgood (University of Michigan 1934), world champion hurdler
 Richard O. Papenguth (University of Michigan 1923), swimming coach, Purdue University and 1952 Summer Olympics women's team
 Otto Peltzer (University of California, Berkeley 1928), world record holding runner, 800 meters, 1000 meters and 1500 meters
 Richard R. Poling (Ohio Wesleyan University 1928), developer of the Poling System of football rankings
 Leo Raskowski (Ohio State University 1929), All-American tackle, 1926 and 1927
 Ernie Steele (University of Washington 1942), pro football player with the Philadelphia Eagles
 Tony Steponovich (University of Southern California 1927), professional football player
 Wes Stock (Washington State University 1954), pitcher with the Baltimore Orioles and Kansas City Athletics; pitching coach for the Oakland A's and Seattle Mariners
 Roger Theder (Western Michigan University 1962), head football coach at the University of California, Berkeley, 1978–81
 Charlie Tyra (University of Louisville 1955), basketball player with the American Basketball League
 Rick Villarreal (Southern Mississippi 1976), former Athletic Director, University of North Texas
 Sam Voinoff (Purdue University 1933), NCAA champion golf coach, Purdue University
 Norbert "Nobby" Wirkowski (Miami University 1948), quarterback and coach with the Toronto Argonauts; football coach and athletic director at York University
 Curtis Youel (University of Southern California 1931), college football coach and athletic director

Other
 Ernie Allen (University of Louisville 1965), president of the National Center for Missing and Exploited Children
 Carmen Cincotti (The College of New Jersey 2012), champion competitive eater
 Arthur A. Ford (Transylvania University 1919), psychic and spiritualist
 Jeffrey Miller (Michigan State University), transferred to Kent State University and was one of four students killed there by the Ohio National Guard in 1970

Sources
 Phi Kappa Tau Centennial Membership Directory, Harris Connect: 2006
 Phi Kappa Tau Membership Manual Centennial Edition: 2006
 The Phi Kappa Tau 400: 1988

External links
 Phi Kappa Tau Hall of Fame

Phi Kappa Tau
Lists of members of United States student societies